Edwin Ford Hunter Jr. (February 18, 1911 – February 22, 2002) was a United States district judge of the United States District Court for the Western District of Louisiana.

Early life, education and career

Born on February 18, 1911, in Alexandria, Louisiana, Hunter received a Bachelor of Laws in 1938 from George Washington University Law School. He entered private practice in Springhill, Louisiana from 1938 to 1941. He continued private practice in Shreveport, Louisiana from 1941 to 1942 and from 1945 to 1953. He served in the United States Navy from 1942 to 1945. He was a member of the Louisiana House of Representatives from 1948 to 1952. He was Executive Counsel to Governor Robert F. Kennon of Louisiana from 1952 to 1953.

Federal judicial service

Hunter received a recess appointment from President Dwight D. Eisenhower on October 3, 1953, to a seat on the United States District Court for the Western District of Louisiana vacated by Judge Gaston Louis Noel Porterie. He was nominated to the same position by President Eisenhower on January 11, 1954. He was confirmed by the United States Senate on February 9, 1954, and received his commission the next day. He served as Chief Judge from 1973 to 1976. He assumed senior status on February 19, 1976. His service terminated on February 22, 2002, due to  his death in Lake Charles, Louisiana. He is interred in Consolata Cemetery in Lake Charles.

See also
 List of United States federal judges by longevity of service

References

Sources
 
 

1911 births
2002 deaths
People from Alexandria, Louisiana
Louisiana lawyers
George Washington University Law School alumni
Members of the Louisiana House of Representatives
Judges of the United States District Court for the Western District of Louisiana
United States district court judges appointed by Dwight D. Eisenhower
20th-century American judges
United States Navy officers
United States Navy personnel of World War II
Military personnel from Louisiana
Burials in Louisiana